The Río Neuquén Subgroup is a geological subgroup in the Neuquén Basin, Neuquén Province, Argentina, whose strata date back to the Late Cretaceous. The subgroup, formerly defined as a formation, is the middle unit of the Neuquén Group and contains the Plottier, Sierra Barrosa Formation, Los Bastos Formation, and Portezuelo Formations. The subgroup overlies the Río Limay Subgroup and is overlain by the Río Colorado Subgroup. Dinosaur remains are among the fossils that have been recovered from the formation.

Fossil content

See also 
 List of dinosaur-bearing rock formations

References

Bibliography 
 
 
 
 
 
 

Geologic formations of Argentina
Neuquén Group
Upper Cretaceous Series of South America
Cretaceous Argentina
Coniacian Stage
Turonian Stage
Cenomanian Stage
Shale formations
Sandstone formations
Fluvial deposits
Fossiliferous stratigraphic units of South America
Paleontology in Argentina
Geology of Mendoza Province
Geology of Neuquén Province
Geology of Río Negro Province
Neuquen